ArpON (ARP handler inspection) is a computer software project to improve network security. It has attracted interest among network managers and academic researchers and is frequently cited as a means of protecting against ARP-based attacks.

Motivation
The Address Resolution Protocol (ARP) has security issues. These include the Man In The Middle (MITM) attack through the ARP Spoofing, ARP Cache Poisoning or ARP Poison Routing attacks.

Solution
ArpON is a Host-based solution that make the ARP standardized protocol secure in order to avoid the Man In The Middle (MITM) attack through the ARP spoofing, ARP cache poisoning or ARP poison routing attack.

This is possible using three kinds of anti ARP spoofing techniques:

 SARPI (Static ARP Inspection) for the statically configured networks without DHCP;
 DARPI (Dynamic ARP Inspection) for the dynamically configured networks with DHCP;
 HARPI (Hybrid ARP Inspection) for the statically and dynamically configured networks with DHCP.

The goal of ArpON is therefore to provide a secure and efficient network daemon that provides the SARPI, DARPI and HARPI anti ARP spoofing technique, thus making the ARP standardized protocol secure from any foreign intrusion.

See also

Arpwatch
Arping

References

External links
 
 Official documentation

Network analyzers
Computer security software
Unix network-related software
Unix security software
Free security software
Free network management software
Free network-related software
Linux security software
Linux network-related software
Free software programmed in C
Software using the BSD license